is a Japanese skeleton racer who has competed since 1997. He finished 18th in the men's skeleton event at both the 2002 and 2006 Winter Olympics. Inada's best finish at the FIBT World Championships was 11th in Nagano in 2003.

He is a graduate of Sendai University.

References
 2002 men's skeleton results
 2006 men's skeleton results
 
 Skeletonsport.com profile

External links
 

1978 births
Japanese male skeleton racers
Living people
Olympic skeleton racers of Japan
Skeleton racers at the 2002 Winter Olympics
Skeleton racers at the 2006 Winter Olympics
Sportspeople from Sapporo
20th-century Japanese people
21st-century Japanese people